M. B. Rajesh (born 12 March 1971) is an Indian politician who has served as the State Minister for Local Self-Governments and Excise of Kerala, since 2022. He previously served as the Speaker of the Kerala Legislative Assembly from 2021 to 2022 and represents Thrithala State Assembly Constituency since 2021.

He was a Member of the Lok Sabha representing Palakkad Lok Sabha Constituency from 2009 to 2019.

Life 
Rajesh is the eldest son of Balakrishnan Nair and M. K. Remani. He was born in Jalandhar, Punjab on 12 March 1971, in a Hindu family. A native of Kayiliad, Chalavara, Shornur in Palakkad District of Kerala, Rajesh is graduated in Law (LL.B) from Government Law College, Thiruvananthapuram under the University of Kerala and postgraduated in economics from the NSS College, Ottapalam affiliated to the University of Calicut. By profession, he is an advocate. Rajesh is married to Ninitha Kanicheri who is an Assistant Professor in Kalady Sanskrit University.

Political career 
Rajesh started his political life while he was a school student by organizing the SFI at the school level. Later he became the President and then-Secretary of SFI Kerala State Committee. He also held positions including the Joint Secretary and Vice President of SFI Central Committee. After his student life, he was active in the DYFI where he became the National President. Rajesh is now a member of the Kerala state committee of CPI(M). M B Rajesh is the current lawmaker from Thrithala legislative constituency in Palakkad district.

Controversies 

The appointment of his wife as assistant professor in Kalady Sanskrit university snowballed into a major political controversy ahead of 2021 legislative assembly elections as one of the subject experts in the interview board alleged irregularities in the process.

Publications 
The books published by Rajesh include
 "History Will Impeach Them" (Charithram Avare Kuttakarennu Vilikkum) collection of articles on education, published in Malayalam, 2002
 "Agolavatkaranathinate Virudha Lokangal" (Contradictory Worlds of Globalisation) collection of articles in Malayalam on globalisation, 2008; 
 "Agola Sampathika Prathisandhiyude Manangal", Compilation of articles on Global Recession, 2008, Malayalam

References

External links
 Official biographical sketch in Parliament of India website

1971 births
Living people
Communist Party of India (Marxist) politicians from Kerala
India MPs 2009–2014
Politicians from Palakkad
India MPs 2014–2019
Lok Sabha members from Kerala
Government Law College, Thiruvananthapuram alumni
DYFI All India Presidents
Speakers of the Kerala Legislative Assembly